"Sanomi" is a song recorded by Belgian six-piece band Urban Trad, written by Yves Barbieux. It is best known as the  entry at the Eurovision Song Contest 2003, held in Riga.

Eurovision

The song was the twenty-second in the running order of the 2003 contest, following 's F.L.Y. with "Hello From Mars" and preceding 's Ruffus with "Eighties Coming Back". At the close of voting, it had received 165 points, placing second in a field of 26.

The song
The song is remarkable for a number of reasons. Perhaps the most readily apparent is that it was the first occasion that a song not in a natural language had been performed at the Eurovision Song Contest (prompting the famous remark of BBC commentator Terry Wogan "they've got four languages in Belgium and they're singing in an imaginary one, the very essence of the Euro").

Further, the song is remarkable for having featured in one of the closest finishes in the contest's history, ultimately finishing with just two fewer points than the eventual winner (Sertab Erener with "Everyway That I Can" for ) and only one point above third-placed  (t.A.T.u. with "Ne Ver', Ne Boysia").

Versions
Two versions of the song exist on record. One was the standard album version (4:08) and another version was released on single and on the Eurovision Song Contest 2003 compilation album.  Often known as the "Eurovision edit", it cut down to 3:01 and it had Soetkin Collier's vocals removed.

This arose because a few months before the contest, the selectors dropped singer Soetkin Collier on the advice of the Belgian security services, who claimed that she had had far right sympathies in the past. Collier vigorously denied the claims, and later that year after an investigation it was concluded that the accusations were exaggerated and based on outdated information.

Track listing
"Sanomi" (Eurovision Edit)
"Get Real"

Charts

External links
 Official Eurovision Song Contest site, history by year, 2003.
 Detailed info and lyrics, The Diggiloo Thrush, "Sanomi".

References

Eurovision songs of Belgium
Eurovision songs of 2003
Constructed languages
2003 songs
Mercury Records singles